For the results of the New Zealand national football team, see:
New Zealand national football team results (1922–1969)
New Zealand national football team results (1970–1999)
New Zealand national football team results (2000–2019)
New Zealand national football team results (2020–present)

B team
New Zealand national football B team results